Ýulduz Jumabaýewa (born 22 April 1998) is a Turkmenistan weightlifter.

She participated at the 2018 World Weightlifting Championships, winning a medal.

Major results

References

External links

1998 births
Living people
Turkmenistan female weightlifters
World Weightlifting Championships medalists